Jewel box or Jewel Box may refer to:

 Jewelry box, a container for gemstones

Places or architecture 
Jewel Box (St. Louis), listed on the NRHP in Missouri
 Jewel Boxes, a name for eight banks designed by architect Louis Sullivan
Jewel Box Park, a type of baseball park

Star cluster 
Jewel Box (star cluster) (NGC 4755), a star cluster in Crux

Music 
"Jewel Box", a track on Jeff Buckley's Sketches for My Sweetheart the Drunk
The Jewel Box, a 1991 pasticcio opera with music by Wolfgang Amadeus Mozart and libretto by Paul Griffiths
Elton: Jewel Box, an 8-disc compilation featuring rare songs by Elton John

Biology 
Chamidae, a family of bivalves known as the jewelboxes
Jewel-box pea crab, a common name for the Gemmotheres chamae crab

Other 
Jewelbox (video game), a tetris-style arcade game for the Mac
Jewel case, Jewel box or Super Jewel Box, types of Optical disc packaging
Tomb of I'timād-ud-Daulah, at Agra is known as Jewel Box for its intricate parchin kari work

ja:宝石箱